Francisco María Oreamuno Bonilla (4 October 1801, Cartago, Costa Rica – 23 May 1856) was head of state of Costa Rica from November to December 1844.

References

1801 births
1856 deaths
People from Cartago Province
Presidents of Costa Rica
Vice presidents of Costa Rica
19th-century Costa Rican people
Costa Rican liberals